Oscar Gallardo (born 10 June 1929) is an Argentine boxer. He competed in the men's light welterweight event at the 1952 Summer Olympics.

References

External links
 

1929 births
Possibly living people
Argentine male boxers
Olympic boxers of Argentina
Boxers at the 1952 Summer Olympics
Pan American Games gold medalists for Argentina
Pan American Games medalists in boxing
Boxers at the 1951 Pan American Games
Place of birth missing (living people)
Lightweight boxers
Medalists at the 1951 Pan American Games